{{DISPLAYTITLE:C4H7NO3}}
The molecular formula C4H7NO3 (molar mass: 117.104 g/mol) may refer to:

 Aceturic acid
 L-Aspartic-4-semialdehyde

Molecular formulas